Camp Alkulana is a summer camp in Millboro Springs, Virginia. It was founded to serve as a summer retreat for urban youth. It is the oldest known surviving summer camp in the state and it continues to specifically cater to low income children who would otherwise be unable to afford camp. Its buildings and grounds are mainly in a rustic style befitting the environment. The camp was listed on the National Register of Historic Places in 2015.

See also
National Register of Historic Places listings in Bath County, Virginia

References

Bath County, Virginia
Alkulana
Park buildings and structures on the National Register of Historic Places in Virginia
Non-profit organizations based in Virginia
National Register of Historic Places in Bath County, Virginia
Historic districts on the National Register of Historic Places in Virginia
Temporary populated places on the National Register of Historic Places
1917 establishments in Virginia